Steliano Filip (born 15 May 1994) is a Romanian professional footballer who plays for Nemzeti Bajnokság I club Mezőkövesd. He started his career as a winger, but was moved to a defensive position and became a left back.

Club career
Filip started his career at the LPS Banatul  football school, in Timișoara. His first professional contract came in 2011, when he accepted the offer that came from FC Maramureș Baia Mare, although Poli Timișoara wanted him to remain in the city.

He impressed at Baia Mare, entering the attention of Juventus Torino.

Dinamo București
In the summer of 2012, Filip made a big step in his career, moving to Dinamo București, where he signed a 5-year contract. He scored his first goal for Dinamo in a friendly game against Austrian team SK Klagenfurt.

His first match in Liga I came on 26 August 2012, when he replaced Cosmin Matei in the 75th minute of a game against Petrolul Ploiești.

Hajduk Split
On 23 January 2018, he signed for Croatian club HNK Hajduk Split on a three and a half year deal, picking the shirt number 77.

Dunărea Călărași
On 15 February 2019 he signed for Dunărea Călărași.

Viitorul Constanța
On 21 June 2019 Steliano Filip signed a 2-year contract with Viitorul Constanța. On 20 January 2020, Viitorul Constanța released Filip.

Return to Dinamo
In January 2021, he returned to Dinamo București, signing a two-and-a-half-year contract. He left the club in July 2022, after Dinamo relegated from Liga I.

Mezőkövesdi SE
On 30 November 2022, he signed a two-and-a-half-year contract with Mezőkövesdi SE.

International career
Filip made his debut for Romania U-17 on 24 March 2011 in a game against Iceland U-17. He played with the under-17 team at the 2011 UEFA European Under-17 Football Championship.

His first game for the national under-21 team was played in August 2013, against Cyprus.

He made his debut for the national team on 17 November 2015, in a friendly game against Italy, played in Bologna.

Career statistics

Club

International stats

Honours
Dinamo București
Cupa României runner-up: 2015–16
Cupa Ligii: 2016–17
Supercupa României: 2012

Hajduk Split
Croatian Cup runner-up: 2017–18

Viitorul Constanța
Supercupa României: 2019

References

External links
 
 Player profile on FC Dinamo

1994 births
Living people
Sportspeople from Timișoara
People from Buzău
Romanian footballers
Association football wingers
Association football fullbacks
Romania international footballers
Romania under-21 international footballers
Romania youth international footballers
UEFA Euro 2016 players
Liga I players
Liga II players
Croatian Football League players
Super League Greece players
Nemzeti Bajnokság I players
FC Dinamo București players
HNK Hajduk Split players
FC Dunărea Călărași players
FC Viitorul Constanța players
Athlitiki Enosi Larissa F.C. players
Mezőkövesdi SE footballers
Romanian expatriate footballers
Romanian expatriate sportspeople in Croatia
Romanian expatriate sportspeople in Greece
Romanian expatriate sportspeople in Hungary
Expatriate footballers in Croatia
Expatriate footballers in Greece
Expatriate footballers in Hungary